This is a list of number-one songs in 1985 on the Italian charts compiled weekly by the Italian Hit Parade Singles Chart.

Chart history

Number-one artists

References

1985
1985 in Italian music
1985 record charts